Duck Lake 76B is a First Nations reserve in Sudbury District, Ontario. It is one of two reserves for the Brunswick House First Nation.

References

Anishinaabe reserves in Ontario
Communities in Sudbury District